Mikhail Borisovich Ignatiev (born 7 May 1985) is a former Russian professional track and road bicycle racer. He recently rode for UCI ProTour team , as well as participating in various track events. He is known as a time trial specialist, and also has a reputation for making the breakaway in road races and trying, often with success, to solo to victory.

Career 
In 2004 Ignatiev achieved his biggest success to date, winning a gold medal in the points race at the Athens Olympics. On the road, Ignatiev came to prominence with his ability in the individual time trial. In 2002 and 2003, he was the World Junior Champion, while in 2005 he became the World Under 23 Champion.

Ignatiev signed his first professional contract in 2006, when he started riding for the  cycling team. This team competed mainly in Russia, but Ignatiev made a big impact during a series of Spanish races in the middle part of the season.

When Tinkoff Credit Systems was established from Tinkoff Restaurants in 2007, Ignatiev moved to Marina di Massa, Italy. Early in the 2007 cycling season, Ignatiev made a name for himself by winning a stage of the Tour Méditerranéen and the Trofeo Laigueglia with successful late attacks. He continued his form throughout the season and won two time trials, the Prologue in Ster Elektrotoer, Stage 4 of the Regio-Tour and the first stage of Vuelta a Burgos.

In the 2009 cycling season he moved to UCI World Tour Team Katusha, a newly formed Russian cycling team, sponsored by Itera, Gazprom and Rostechnologies. In his first season, he achieved some greatest results having taken two podiums at 2009 Tour de France.

Career achievements

Major results

2002
 1st  Time trial, UCI Junior Road World Championships
 UCI Junior Track World Championships
1st  Points race
1st  Team pursuit
 1st  Points race, UEC European Junior Track Championships
2003
 1st  Time trial, UCI Junior Road World Championships
 UCI Junior Track World Championships
1st  Madison
1st  Team pursuit
 1st  Team pursuit, UEC European Junior Track Championships
2004
 1st  Points race, Olympic Games
2005
 1st  Time trial, UCI Road World Under–23 Championships
2006
 1st  Individual pursuit, UEC European Under–23 Track Championships
 1st  Overall Volta a Lleida
1st Stages 1 & 2
 1st Clásica Memorial Txuma
 2nd  Time trial, UCI Road World Under–23 Championships
2007
 1st Trofeo Laigueglia
 1st Stage 3 Tour Méditerranéen
 1st Prologue Ster Elektrotoer
 1st Stage 4 Regio-Tour
 1st Stage 1 Vuelta a Burgos
 2nd Grand Prix d'Ouverture La Marseillaise
 5th Tour du Haut Var
 2nd  Time trial, UCI Road World Under–23 Championships
 3rd  Points race, UCI Track World Championships
 1st Fuga Gilera classification Giro d'Italia
2010
 1st Stage 6 Tirreno–Adriatico
2011
 1st  Time trial, National Road Championships
  Combativity award  Stage 16 Tour de France
2012
 3rd Overall Driedaagse van West-Vlaanderen
2013
 1st  Turkish Beauties classification, Presidential Tour of Turkey
 3rd Overall Tour du Poitou-Charentes

Grand Tour general classification results timeline

References

External links 

 Team profile
 Mikhail Ignatiev on Sport-Topics.Ru
 

Living people
1985 births
Russian male cyclists
Russian track cyclists
Olympic cyclists of Russia
Cyclists at the 2004 Summer Olympics
Cyclists at the 2008 Summer Olympics
Olympic gold medalists for Russia
Olympic bronze medalists for Russia
Cyclists from Saint Petersburg
Olympic medalists in cycling
Medalists at the 2008 Summer Olympics
Medalists at the 2004 Summer Olympics